The 1955 Yukon general election was held on 28 September 1955 to elect the five members of the Yukon Territorial Council. The council was non-partisan and had merely an advisory role to the federally appointed Commissioner.

Members elected

References

1955
1955 elections in Canada
Election
September 1955 events in Canada